is a 2023 English-language Japanese action fantasy film directed by Tomasz Bagiński from a screenplay by writing team Josh Campbell & Matt Stuecken with Kiel Murray.  The film is a live-action adaptation of the manga Saint Seiya by Masami Kurumada.  It stars Mackenyu as Seiya.

The film is scheduled to be released in Latin America on April 27, 2023, and on April 28 in Japan.

Premise 
When a goddess of war reincarnates in the body of a young girl, street orphan Seiya discovers that he is destined to protect her and save the world. But only if he can face his own past and become a Knight of the Zodiac.

Cast 
 Mackenyu as Seiya
 Madison Iseman as Sienna / Athena
 Sean Bean as Alman Kiddo
 Diego Tinoco as Nero
 Famke Janssen as V. Guraad
 Nick Stahl as Cassios 
 Mark Dacascos as Mylock

Production 
Saint Seiya creator Masami Kurumada wanted to adapt it to a film almost as long as he worked on the manga, and in 2016, Toei Animation first revealed that such a live-action adaptation was in development at CCXP. Toei later gave the project an official green-light in May 2017 with Tomasz Bagiński directing. It was originally to be a co-production with Sony Pictures and Chinese company A Really Good Film Company, who would later drop out.  The original screenplay was adapted by Josh Campbell and Matt Stuecken, with later additions by Kiel Murray. The main cast was announced in September 2021, including Mackenyu, Madison Iseman , Sean Bean, Diego Tinoco, Famke Janssen, Nick Stahl, and Mark Dacascos.

Filming took place July–September 2021 in Hungary, and the production had a budget of $60 million. Andy Cheng provided the fight and stunt coordination.

Release 
The film is scheduled to be released in Latin America on April 27, 2023, and on April 28 in Japan.  It will release in the United States on May 12.

References

External links 
 
 

2020s English-language films
English-language Japanese films
Live-action films based on manga
Sony Pictures films
Stage 6 Films films
Toei Animation films
Saint Seiya